Rimini Lighthouse is an active lighthouse located on the east side of the channel harbour of Rimini, Emilia-Romagna on the Adriatic Sea.

History
The first lighthouse was designed by the architect Luigi Vanvitelli in 1733, on the will of Pope Clement XII, but the tower was then completed in 1745 by Giovanni Francesco Buonamici. Partially destroyed during the bombardments of World War II, the lighthouse was rebuilt in 1946.

Description
The lighthouse is completely automated and operated by the Marina Militare with the identification code number 4005 E.F.

See also
 List of lighthouses in Italy
 Rimini

References

External links

 Servizio Fari Marina Militare

Lighthouses in Italy
Buildings and structures in Rimini
Lighthouses completed in 1862
1733 establishments in Italy